DeKalb Avenue is a thoroughfare in the New York City boroughs of Brooklyn and Queens, with the majority of its length in Brooklyn. 

It runs from Woodward Avenue (Linden Hill Cemetery) in Ridgewood, Queens to Downtown Brooklyn, terminating at the Fulton Mall where the Dime Savings Bank and City Point cross. 

DeKalb Avenue is named after Baron Johann de Kalb, who served in the American Revolutionary War.

Notable buildings
Landmarks along the avenue include the Pratt Institute, Fort Greene Park, the Brooklyn Hospital Center, the DeKalb and Marcy branches of the Brooklyn Public Library, Long Island University's Brooklyn Campus, Brooklyn Technical High School, and Junior's.

Transport operation
Between Woodward Avenue and Bushwick Avenue, DeKalb Avenue is a two-way, two-lane street; between Bushwick Avenue and Fulton Street, it is one-way westbound. (Lafayette Avenue is the corresponding parallel one-way street eastbound.) 

The B38 bus, operated by MTA New York City Transit, runs along most of the route.

A bike lane, installed in 2004 and extended in 2008, exists between Malcolm X Boulevard and Flatbush Avenue. The NYCDOT proposed in 2008 to introduce traffic calming and other improvements to  DeKalb Avenue.

Subway
Two New York City Subway stations serve DeKalb Avenue:

DeKalb Avenue on the BMT Fourth Avenue Line and BMT Brighton Line
DeKalb Avenue on the BMT Canarsie Line

In addition, the following subway stations are within one or two blocks of DeKalb Avenue:

Nevins Street on the IRT Eastern Parkway Line
Lafayette Avenue on the IND Fulton Street Line
Fulton Street, Clinton–Washington Avenues, Classon Avenue, and Bedford–Nostrand Avenues on the IND Crosstown Line
Kosciuszko Street on the BMT Jamaica Line
Central Avenue on the BMT Myrtle Avenue Line

References

Streets in Brooklyn
Bedford–Stuyvesant, Brooklyn
Bushwick, Brooklyn
Downtown Brooklyn
Ridgewood, Queens